Toy Kingdom is a large toy store chain owned and developed by the SM Group by the late Chinese Filipino taipan, Henry Sy, Sr., along with its corporation name, the "International Toyworld Inc". It features a variety of toys, gizmos & gadgets. The first branch opened at SM Megamall in 1991. Now there are more than 20 branches opened inside and outside SM Supermalls. Aside from the regular Toy Kingdom stores, SM Stores have smaller toy sections called Toy Kingdom Express.

Toy Kingdom's main rivals in the Philippines are Toys "R" Us (located at several Robinsons Malls, and Ayala Malls) and ToyTown (with branches at Glorietta, Festival Supermall, and Market! Market!). Kidz Station (with three locations in Makati and one at the Shangri-la Plaza Mall in Mandaluyong) was also a rival store until Toys "R" Us acquired them on November 2010.

Toy Kingdom holds the biennial major event Toy Expo Philippines, which gathers toy brands to showcase their latest offerings through exhibit set-ups and activities. A free-admission event, usually held during August at the SMX Convention Center in the Mall of Asia Complex, Toy Expo Philippines started in 2012. It held its 4th edition in 2018 from August 24 to 26 participated by brands such as Peppa Pig, My Little Pony, Play-Doh, Shopkins, Littlest Pet Shop, PAW Patrol, Super Wings, and many more.

Toy Kingdom Amazing Card
It is a loyalty program in which members get to earn rewards points, big savings, and are entitled to exclusive privileges throughout the membership period. Simply avail the Toy Kingdom Amazing Kit at any Toy Kingdom mall branch, fill up and submit the membership form, and get your Toy Kingdom Amazing Card once the payment has been completed.

References

External links
 Toy Kingdom The official website of Toy Kingdom
 The SM Store. The official website of The SM Store
 SM Prime Holdings. The official website of the parent company.

Retail companies established in 1991
Retail companies of the Philippines
Toy companies of the Philippines
SM Prime
Toy retailers
Companies based in Pasay
1991 establishments in the Philippines